The 1990 Vuelta a España was the 45th edition of the Vuelta a España, one of cycling's Grand Tours. The race finished in Madrid on 15 May.

Stage 12
5 May 1990 —  to Naranco,

Stage 13
6 May 1990 — Oviedo to Santander,

Stage 14
7 May 1990 — Santander to Nájera,

Stage 15
8 May 1990 — Ezcaray to Valdezcaray,  (ITT)

Stage 16
9 May 1990 — Logroño to Pamplona,

Stage 17
10 May 1990 — Pamplona to Jaca,

Stage 18
11 May 1990 — Jaca to Cerler,

Stage 19
12 May 1990 — Benasque to Zaragoza,

Stage 20
13 May 1990 — Zaragoza to Zaragoza,  (ITT)

Stage 21
14 May 1990 — Collado Villalba to Palazuelos de Eresma,

Stage 22
15 May 1990 — Segovia to Madrid,

References

12
1990,12